Rudolf Næss (1914 - 2003) was a Norwegian illustrator known for his "NN under SS" collection of water color illustrations, detailing various aspects of life as a Nacht and Nebel prisoner at Natzweiler-Struthof concentration camp during World War II. The collection of images is part of Norwegian legacy documents, established to preserve and highlight unique and irreplaceable documents. The register is also part of the UNESCO World Heritage List, and is owned and kept by the Norwegian National Library. The images are also featured in the Night and Fog Prisoners exhibition at Arkivet Peace and Human Rights Center, an education and documentation center based in Kristiansand in Southern Norway.

Biography 
Rudolf was born in Oslo, Norway, but moved to Bergen, Norway at age 14. He worked as an illustrator, at times in the advertising industry. At age 29, he was arrested and imprisoned at Natzweiler. In 1945, he was rescued by the White buses, a Swedish Red Cross Operation. Back home, he obtained photographs and details about the camps, and combined this information with his own memories to produce an album of 39 watercolor images over the course of two years. This visual testimony detailing aspects of life as a NN prisoner is unique in how his experiences were not translated into words. Upon completion in 1947, Næss gave the pictures to the university library in Oslo.

References

External links 
 Krigstrykk 2 Rudolf Næss: Album from Natzweiler.

1914 births
2003 deaths
Artists from Bergen
Artists from Oslo
Natzweiler-Struthof concentration camp survivors
Night and Fog program
Norwegian illustrators
20th-century Norwegian male artists
Watercolorists